Thomas Henry Jackson (March 1870 – 2 December 1952) was a Welsh rugby union forward who played club rugby for Swansea and international rugby for Wales.

Rugby career
Jackson first joined first class Welsh team Swansea in 1893, around the same time as Albert Jenkin. In 1895 Jackson was selected for the Wales national team for the opening match of the 1895 Home Nations Championship. The game was played at home, at Swansea's St. Helen's to England. Jackson was one of five new caps brought into the Wales team, though he and Cardiff's William Elsey were the only new players in the pack. The Welsh forwards were outplayed by a livelier English pack in a game which saw Wales lose 6-14. Jackson was replaced for the next game by Harry Packer and never represented Wales again.

In 1899, Jackson was one of the Swansea team, who were invited to play against a French team in Paris. Although the French international team was not officially formed until 1906, there was a French Rugby Championship, and an 'All France' team was assembled to face Swansea. The two teams met on 16 April 1899 which Swansea won 30-3 with Jackson believed to have scored the first try.

International matches played
Wales
  1895

Bibliography

References

1870 births
1952 deaths
Rugby union locks
Rugby union players from Swansea
Swansea RFC players
Wales international rugby union players